Kanespi may refer to:
 Kanespi, Beradust
 Kanespi, alternate name of Kanisi, Beradust Rural District
 Kanespi, Sumay-ye Jonubi